Maria Thaddäus von Trautmannsdorff (28 May 1761 – 20 January 1819) was a cardinal of the Roman Catholic Church.

Early life 
He was born on 28 May 1761 in Graz as son of Imperial Count Weikhard Joseph von Trauttmansdorff-Weinsberg (1711-1788) and Countess Maria Anna von Wurmbrand-Stuppach (1733-1807).

Ecclesiastical career 
He was ordained as Bishop of Hradec Králové on 8 September 1795. On 26 November 1811 he was elected Archbishop of Olomouc. Due to the imprisonment of Pope Pius VII by Napoleon Bonaparte, papal approval of this decision did not take place until 15 March 1814. On 23 September 1816 he was appointed cardinal.

He died in Vienna on 20 January 1819 and was buried in Olomouc.

References 

1761 births
1819 deaths
Bishops of Olomouc
Clergy from Graz
19th-century Austrian cardinals